John Dingwall (13 July 1940 – 3 May 2004) was an Australian journalist, writer and director of film and television, best known for his screenplay Sunday Too Far Away (1975). Dingwall should not be confused with the Scottish journalist of the same name.

Career
Dingwall was born in Rockhampton, Queensland, where he commenced his career as a journalist with a cadetship at the city's daily newspaper, The Morning Bulletin. He then moved to Sydney, where he worked as a police reporter for The Sydney Morning Herald before going to Crawford Productions as a television writer, working on programs such as Homicide and Division Four.

He moved into features with Sunday Too Far Away, which was based on his brother-in-law's experiences as a sheep shearer. He later became a producer and director.

Personal life and death
He died on the Gold Coast on 3 May 2004. His son Kelly Dingwall (born 23 December 1970) is an actor, best known for his role as Brian "Dodge" Forbes on Home and Away and many other Australian TV series.

Filmography
His film and TV series credits include:
Matlock Police (TV series) – writer
Sunday Too Far Away (1975) – writer
Pig in a Poke (1977) (TV series) – writer, creator
Buddies (1983) – writer, producer
Phobia (1987) – director, writer
The Custodian (1993) – director, writer

References

External links

"John Dingwall" at AustLit

1940 births
2004 deaths
Australian film directors
Australian screenwriters
Australian television directors
Australian television writers
Logie Award winners
20th-century Australian screenwriters
20th-century Australian journalists
The Sydney Morning Herald people
Australian male television writers